Francisc Zavoda (14 April 1927 – July 2011), also known as Zavoda I, was a Romanian footballer. He was the older brother of Vasile Zavoda who was also an International footballer and they played together at Steaua București.

Career as football player
Zavoda played as striker for Phoenix Baia Mare (1947–1948), CFR București (1948–1949) and then Steaua București (1950–1960). He played a total of 200 games in Divizia A and scored 43 goals. He was champion of Romania in five occasions and won four Romanian Cups. He won eight caps for Romania. He was also part of Romania's squad at the 1952 Summer Olympics, but he did not play in any matches.

Career as coach
Zavoda was assistant coach at Steaua București (1964–1966) and ASA Târgu Mureş (1979–1980) and head coach at Progresul Brăila (1983).

Honours

Club

Steaua București
Romanian League (5):  1951, 1952, 1953, 1956, 1959–60
Romanian Cup (4): 1950, 1951, 1952, 1955

References

External links
 
 

1927 births
2011 deaths
People from Bistrița-Năsăud County
Romanian footballers
Romania international footballers
Liga I players
Liga II players
CS Minaur Baia Mare (football) players
FC Rapid București players
FC Steaua București players
Association football forwards
Romanian football managers
FC Steaua București assistant managers
AFC Dacia Unirea Brăila managers
Olympic footballers of Romania
Footballers at the 1952 Summer Olympics